Bernard Rodrigues (15 March 1933 – 17 August 2015) was a Singaporean politician. Rodrigues represented Telok Blangah as a legislative assemblyman in the 1st Parliament of Singapore from 1965 till 1968. He was a founding member of the People's Action Party and helped establish the National Trades Union Congress (NTUC). Rodrigues argued that making the NTUC effective was in the best interest of Singapore, as it would be a constructive alternative to pro-Communist movements. In 1966, he campaigned for government employees to receive their entitled backpay, clashing with Lim Kim San who discouraged such a move. Rodrigues relocated to Sydney, Australia in 1972.

References

2015 deaths
People's Action Party politicians
1933 births
Members of the Parliament of Singapore